The French submarine Turquoise was a  built for the French Navy in the mid-1930s. Laid down in October 1926, it was launched in May 1929 and commissioned in September 1930. Turquoise was disarmed at Bizerte, Tunisia and renamed FR 116 after being captured there by Italian forces on 8 December 1942. Turquoise was recaptured and scuttled by German forces at Naples, Italy on 8 May 1943.

Design
Propulsion while surfaced was provided by two  Normand-Vickers diesel motors and while submerged two  electric motors. The submarines electrical propulsion allowed it to attain speeds of 
 while submerged.

The Saphir-class submarines were constructed to be able to launch torpedoes and lay mines without surfacing. They were attached to the submarine's exterior under a hydrodynamic protection and were jettisoned with compressed air. The Saphir-class submarines also featured an automatic depth regulator that automatically flooded ballast tanks after mines were dropped to prevent the risk of the submarine surfacing in the middle of enemy waters.

See also 

List of submarines of France
French submarines of World War II

Citations

References 

Submarines of France
World War II submarines of France
Saphir-class submarines (1928)
Captured ships
1929 ships